The Nevėžis Plain is a plain (lowland) in central Lithuania, and makes a part of the Central Lithuanian Plain. Its northern limit is marked by the Nevėžis and Lėvuo watershed, while other limits are marked by small ridges (the Vilkija Ridge, Viešintos Ridge, Kavarskas Ridge, Krakės Ridge and others).

There are three levels of the Nevėžis Plain: Traupis level (altitude 80-90 meters), Pagiriai level (70-80 meters) and the Nevėžis river level (65 meters).

River density is high but rivers themselves are slow, sink during the summer. Typical soil is moraine loam with a tiny layer of sand.

The Nevėžis Plain is heavily cultivated area (wheat, sugar beet, rapeseed, barley, potatoes) but significant part (20-30 %) is covered by forests (birch, aspen, oak, ash, pine, spruce trees).

References

Landforms of Lithuania